The Historical Encyclopedia of Western Australia (HEWA) from the Centre for Western Australian History at the University of Western Australia was published in June 2009. Although work on it started in 2003, the idea within the university for an historical encyclopedia of Western Australia dates to the early 1990s.

Context
Two comparable earlier works are Cyclopedia of Western Australia by James Battye in 1912, and A New History of Western Australia by Tom Stannage in 1981.

In its introduction, the encyclopedia suggests it

Following publication of the encyclopedia, an index, alphabetical list of entries and a list of errata known at the time was published in 2010 to complement the encyclopedia. Hardcopies of the encyclopedia were sold at the State Library of Western Australia, advertised in part as follows.
 

Papers relevant to the preparation and composition of the work were deposited in the State Library of Western Australia in the 2000s.

In 2010 the encyclopedia was shortlisted for the Western Australian Premier's Book Award.

The Editorial Advisory Board comprised the following:

Contemporaneous volumes in Australia

In her introduction, Gregory places the publication with others from other states:

Publishing details

See also
Australian Dictionary of Biography
Dictionary of Australian Biography
J S Battye Library
Western Australia Post Office Directory
State Records Office of Western Australia

References

Historical Encyclopedia of Western Australia
Books about Western Australia
UWA Publishing books
Encyclopedias of history
Australian encyclopaedias